Annika Hahn-Englund, born 1962, is a Swedish diplomat. She is ambassador to Belgium and Luxembourg.

Career 
She was counsellor to the European Parliament. She visited University of Luxembourg. She supported the International Day Against Homophobia, Biphobia & Transphobia. She talked at a Gender Equality Conference. She spoke at the International Women's Day, at the Embassy of Denmark. She celebrated National Sweden Day, and  Italian Republic Day.

She was a representative on the Border Barriers Council.

References

External links 
Between Stockholm & Brussels: an interview with Annika Hahn-Englund Ambassador of Sweden to Belgium, Back On Track Belgium, 9 Nov. 2020

Living people
1962 births
Swedish women ambassadors
Ambassadors of Sweden to Belgium
Ambassadors of Sweden to Luxembourg